Auguste Legros (30 December 1922 – 30 May 2008) was a politician of La Réunion island. He was Member of Parliament for Réunion's 1st constituency from 1988 to 1993.

References

2008 deaths
1922 births

Deputies of the 9th National Assembly of the French Fifth Republic
Members of Parliament for Réunion
20th-century French politicians